Joseph B. Campbell was an American politician from Maine. Campbell served three non-consecutive terms in the Maine Legislature, including one (1948-1950) in the Maine House of Representatives and two (1962-1964 and 1966-1968) in the Maine Senate. During his final term in the Senate, Campbell served as President. He was a Republican representing the city of Augusta, Maine.

References

Year of birth missing
Year of death missing
Politicians from Augusta, Maine
Republican Party members of the Maine House of Representatives
Presidents of the Maine Senate
Republican Party Maine state senators